Foeniculoside I is a stilbenoid. It is a glucoside of the stilbene trimer cis-miyabenol C. It can be found in Foeniculi fructus (fruit of Foeniculum vulgare).

References

External links 
 Foeniculoside I at the Human Metabolome Database

Stilbenoid glycosides
Resveratrol oligomers
Polyphenols